WORA-TV (channel 5) branded on-air as ABC Puerto Rico, is a television station in Mayagüez, Puerto Rico, affiliated with ABC and owned by Telecinco Media Holdings. WORA-TV's studios are located on Ponce de León Avenue in Santurce, with additional studios at the Guanajibo Building in Mayagüez. The station's transmitter is located at Monte del Estado in Maricao.

WRFB (channel 5) in Carolina operates as a full-time satellite of WORA-TV, serving San Juan and eastern Puerto Rico.

History

Founded by Alfredo Ramírez de Arellano y Bártoli in 1955, WORA-TV was the first television station on Puerto Rico's west coast and the third station islandwide after WKAQ-TV and WAPA-TV (established in the same year earlier). The station was named for then-sister station WORA radio (760 AM), which one year later was joined by WORA-FM (97.5 FM, now WIOB), the first FM broadcaster on the west coast. During its early years, the station produced its own programming, but its schedule eventually shifted toward infomercials, possibly due to the lack of interest from local businesses in advertising on television. In 1969, WORA-TV became a repeater station for WRIK-TV, airing their programming on the west coast of the island.

In 1979, WORA-TV entered into an affiliation agreement with San Juan-based WAPA-TV, ending its run as a locally-run independent station. After that, most television stations on the island's western coast followed suit. By joining with economically stronger stations from the San Juan market, market divisions on the island ended.

In 1985, WORA-TV changed its affiliation agreement to WKAQ-TV, and on January 1, 1995, it began a new affiliation agreement with WLII.

On September 19, 2014, it was announced that WORA would become an ABC affiliate on November 1, 2014, replacing low-power station WPRU-LP, carrying the network on a subchannel branded as ABC 5.

On January 1, 2015, WORA-TV again become a semi-satellite of WKAQ-TV on channel 5.1. Univision programming moved to WOLE-DT channel 12, on the same date. On March 9, 2015, WORA's third digital subchannel added VIVE, which broadcasts series from Televisión Española.

On June 27, 2019, WORA-TV announced that will end an affiliation agreement with WKAQ-TV by December 31, leaving Telemundo without a western affiliate after more than four years. Later, Hemisphere Media Group, the owners of WAPA-TV, announced that Telemundo would air on a subchannel of WNJX-TV by January 1, 2020. On December 18, WORA-TV announced that it will move ABC programming to the station's primary channel on January 1.

On July 1, 2019, VIVE switched to a simulcast of the 24H news channel from TVE.

On December 1, 2020, WORA-TV, WRFB and its translator stations launched as Telecinco, a new independent station combining news programming from RT and horse racing from Hipodromo Camarero. Telecinco is seen over-the-air on the station's fourth digital subchannel. On March 1, 2022, The station lost its RT affiliation after the 2022 Russian invasion of Ukraine and was replaced by Deutsche Welle.

Digital television

Digital channels
The station's digital signal is multiplexed:

Analog-to-digital conversion
WORA-TV shut down its analog signal, over VHF channel 5, on June 12, 2009, the official date when full-power television stations in the United States transitioned from analog to digital broadcasts under federal mandate. The station's digital signal remained on its pre-transition UHF channel 29. Through the use of Program and System Information Protocol, digital television receivers display the station's virtual channel as its former VHF analog channel 5.

Translator stations
WORA-TV can be seen across Puerto Rico on the following stations:

Programming
In addition to ABC network programming, WORA-TV airs some local shows in Spanish, mostly on Sunday afternoons.

News operation
WORA-TV had a small news division branded as WORA-TV Noticias, which aired during WKAQ-TV's Telenoticias news broadcasts on WORA-DT1. These 15 to 30 minute news segments focus on events happening in and around Mayagüez and Puerto Rico's west coast. On June 28, 2019, WORA-TV laid off 19 employees. This caused the closing of the entire news department and the newscasts have been canceled.

Currently, WORA-TV (which is affiliated with ABC), airs a simulcast of WABC-TV's Eyewitness News. Unlike most ABC affiliates, which produce their local newscasts in English, WORA-TV produces their local newscasts in Spanish. The local programs, Directo y Sin Filtro (hosted by Limarys Suarez, Carmen Jovet and Jonathan Lebrón Ayala) and Primetime (hosted by Nicole Marie Colón) broadcast in the evening.

On April 14, 2021, after nearly two years without a regional news operation, WORA-TV announces its return to news programming, with the launch of ABC News Extra, a local newscast headed by female journalists. Anchored by Veronique Abreu Tañon and Yarimar Marrero, the locally produced newscast airs weeknights at 7:00 p.m.

Local programs produced by WORA-TV
 ABC News Extra
 Directo y Sin Filtro
 Primetime
 De Show con Gricel
 Fan Zone
 La Gran Entrevista
 Veronique
 Juan de Vega de Show 
 Por las Fiestas de mi Pueblo
 Turismo con Perea
 Muy Interesante

References

External links
WORA-TV – Official website
ABC Puerto Rico – Official website for ABC Puerto Rico

ORA-TV
Mayagüez, Puerto Rico
ABC network affiliates
Television channels and stations established in 1955
1955 establishments in Puerto Rico